The Trans Tasman Cup was an amateur team golf event played between Australia and New Zealand. It was played annually from 2007 to 2010 and finally in 2012. It was made up of four different contests: men, women, boys and girls. Each of the four contests had been held previously but these events were the first time they had been held together with an overall winner. The overall result was determined by the combined score from all four contests. It was held by Golf Australia and New Zealand Golf. Australia won all five events.

Format
The event was played over two days. Each team was made up of 16 players, four players for each of the four different contests. Two foursomes and four singles matches were played each day. All matches were over 18 holes.

2007 event
The 2007 event was held on 22 and 23 February at the Royal Canberra Golf Club in Australia. Australia won the match 24½ to 23½, although they lost three of the four categories, only winning the girls event.

2008 event
The 2008 event was held on 1 and 2 May at the Royal Wellington Golf Club in New Zealand. Australia won a rain-affected match 25 to 15.

2009 event
The 2009 event was held on 3 and 4 March at the Royal Canberra Golf Club in Australia. Australia won 33 to 15. New Zealand won the women's Tasman Cup.

2010 event
The 2010 event was held on 29 and 30 March at the Royal Wellington Golf Club in New Zealand. Australia won 31 to 17.

2012 event
The 2012 event was held on 8 and 9 March at the Peninsula Country Golf Club in Frankston, Victoria. Australia won 34½ to 13½, although New Zealand regained the Sloan Morpeth Trophy.

References

Team golf tournaments
Amateur golf tournaments in Australia
Golf tournaments in New Zealand
Recurring sporting events established in 2007
Recurring sporting events disestablished in 2012